Theudoria was an ancient town located in south-eastern Epirus. It was one of the chief towns of the Athamanians, along with Argithea, Heraclea and Tetraphylia.

References 

Populated places in ancient Epirus
Former populated places in Greece